Raynor is an English surname which was first found in the historic county of Yorkshire and was brought to England after the Norman Conquest as Reyner. The name Reyner either derived from the Old Norse Ragnar meaning 'counsel' or the Gallo-Roman Reginorum meaning 'royalty'. Notable people with the surname include:

 Gareth Raynor (born 1978), English rugby player
William Raynor (July 1795 – 13 December 1860) Victorian Cross Recipient 
 George Raynor (1907–1985), English footballer and football manager
 George Raynor (cricketer) (1852–1887), English clergyman, schoolmaster and cricketer
 Michael E. Raynor (born 1967), Canadian author and researcher
 Paul Raynor (born 1966), English football player and manager
 Scott Raynor (born 1978), American musician
 Taylor Raynor (born 1983), American politician
 Vivien Raynor (died 2009), American art writer

See also 
 Jim Raynor, fictional character in the StarCraft series and Heroes of the Storm
Rainer (disambiguation)
Rainier (disambiguation)
Rayner (disambiguation)
Reiner (disambiguation)
Reyner

References

English-language surnames